The CLCN family of voltage-dependent chloride channel genes comprises nine members (CLCN1-7, Ka and Kb) which demonstrate quite diverse functional characteristics while sharing significant sequence homology. The protein encoded by this gene regulates the electric excitability of the skeletal muscle membrane. Mutations in this gene cause two forms of inherited human muscle disorders: recessive generalized myotonia congenita (Becker) and dominant myotonia (Thomsen).

Chloride channel protein, skeletal muscle (CLCN1) is a protein that in humans is encoded by the CLCN1 gene.  Mutations in this protein cause congenital myotonia.

CLCN1 is critical for the normal function of skeletal muscle cells. For the body to move normally, skeletal muscles must tense (contract) and relax in a coordinated way. Muscle contraction and relaxation are controlled by the flow of ions into and out of muscle cells. CLCN1 forms an ion channel that controls the flow of negatively charged chloride ions into these cells. The main function of this channel is to stabilize the cells' electrical charge, enabling muscles to contract normally.

In people with congenital myotonia due to a mutation in CLCN1, the ion channel admits too few chloride ions into the cell.  This shortage of chloride ions causes prolonged muscle contractions, which are the hallmark of myotonia.

See also
 Chloride channel
 Thomsen disease

References

Further reading

External links
  GeneReviews/NCBI/NIH/UW entry on Myotonia Congenita
 
 

Chloride channels